Shirley Bond (born 1956 or 1957) is a Canadian politician who served as interim leader of the BC Liberal Party from 2020 to 2022, and also served as the Leader of the Opposition in British Columbia. She was first elected to the Legislative Assembly of British Columbia in the 2001. She was re-elected for a fifth term as MLA for the Prince George-Valemount riding in 2017. She was appointed Minister of Jobs, Tourism and Skills Training and Minister responsible for Labour on June 10, 2013 serving in that capacity until the Liberal government was unseated in a non-confidence vote in 2017.

She also served as vice-chair of the Treasury Board, chaired the Cabinet Committee on New Relationship Coordination, and sat as a member of the cabinet climate action committee. Before being elected to the legislative assembly, she served three terms on the Prince George school board. Bond lives in Prince George with Bill, her husband of more than 30 years, their twin adult children and their families, including grandsons Caleb and Cooper.

Prior to being elected, Bond was also attending the University of Northern British Columbia but did not attain her bachelor's degree. She has an arts and sciences diploma from the College of New Caledonia.

Electoral record

References

External links
 Shirley Bond MLA Page
 Minister's bio page in BC Newsroom
 Ministry of Jobs, Tourism and Skills Training
 @ShirleyBond on Twitter

 

Year of birth missing (living people)
Living people
Attorneys General of British Columbia
British Columbia Liberal Party MLAs
Women government ministers of Canada
Education ministers of British Columbia
Health ministers of British Columbia
Members of the Executive Council of British Columbia
Tourism ministers of British Columbia
Deputy premiers of British Columbia
People from Prince George, British Columbia
Women MLAs in British Columbia
University of Northern British Columbia alumni
21st-century Canadian politicians
21st-century Canadian women politicians
Solicitors general of Canadian provinces